Howard Stewart Lee (October 13, 1929 – November 13, 2014) was a Canadian ice hockey player who competed in the 1956 Winter Olympics.

Lee was a member of the Kitchener-Waterloo Dutchmen who won the bronze medal for Canada in ice hockey at the 1956 Winter Olympics.

References

External links

Howie Lee's profile at Sports Reference.com

1929 births
2014 deaths
Canadian ice hockey defencemen
Cleveland Barons (1937–1973) players
Ice hockey players at the 1956 Winter Olympics
Medalists at the 1956 Winter Olympics
Olympic bronze medalists for Canada
Olympic ice hockey players of Canada
Pittsburgh Hornets players
Ice hockey people from Toronto
Toronto Marlboros players